John Penn may refer to:

Descendants of William Penn, 1st proprietor of Pennsylvania:
John Penn ("the American") (1700–1746), son of William Penn, 2nd proprietor of Pennsylvania, inherited 50% interest in Colony, died childless
John Penn (governor) (1729–1795), son of Richard Penn, Sr. and grandson of William Penn, colonial governor of Pennsylvania, his 25% interest in the Colony was lost in the American Revolution
John Penn (writer) (1760–1834), also called John Penn of Stoke, son of Thomas Penn and grandson of William Penn, 5th proprietor of Pennsylvania, his 75% interest in the Colony was lost in the American Revolution
John Penn (North Carolina politician) (1741–1788), Continental Congressman from North Carolina, signer of the Declaration of Independence
John Penn (engineer) (1805–1878), British marine engine engineer
John Penn (Conservative politician) (1848–1903), MP for Lewisham 1891–1903
John Penn (architect) (1921–2007), British architect  
Jack Penn (1909–1996), surgeon
John Garrett Penn (1932–2007), United States federal judge
John S. Penn (born 1926), American politician the New Jersey General Assembly
John Penne, MP for Melcombe Regis